WCI may refer to:

Companies
 WCI Communities, a subsidiary of the home construction company Lennar Corporation
 Western Climate Initiative, a non-profit corporation that administers emissions trading markets in North America
 White Sewing Machine Company, an appliance company at one time known as White Consolidated Industries

Schools
 Walkerville Collegiate Institute, a secondary school located in the Walkerville area of Windsor, Ontario
 Walnut Creek Intermediate, a middle school in Walnut Creek, California
 Waterloo Collegiate Institute, a secondary school in Waterloo, Ontario
 Western Culinary Institute, former name of Le Cordon Bleu College of Culinary Arts in Portland, Oregon
 Westmount Collegiate Institute, a secondary school in Thornhill, Ontario
 Woburn Collegiate Institute, a secondary school in Toronto, Ontario
Woodstock Collegiate Institute, a secondary school in Woodstock, Ontario

Other uses
 Waci language, by ISO 639-3 code
 Washington Correctional Institute, former name of the B.B. Rayburn Correctional Center in Washington Parish, Louisiana
 Wiki Conference India, a national Wikipedia conference organised in India